The 2020 Tobago Council of the People's National Movement election were held on January 19, 2020. For the first time, a one member, one vote voting system was adopted for all 17 positions contested. The winner, Tracy Davidson-Celestine, the first female political leader for the party, will go on to contest the Chief Secretary position of the Tobago House of Assembly in the 2021 Tobago House of Assembly election.

Background 
The announcement of the election was made on November 10, 2019 by Chief Secretary of the Tobago House of Assembly and Political leader of the Tobago Council of the People's National Movement, Kelvin Charles while speaking at the PNM's 49th annual convention, Queen's Park Savannah, Port of Spain.

Positions contested 
A total of 45 candidates contested the 17 positions on the Executive of the Tobago Council, the winner are as follows:

Declared candidates 
Roles in bold are currently held.

Result 
Tracy Davidson-Celestine was elected leader in the second round of voting. The result of the election are as follows:

See also 
2022 People's National Movement leadership election

Notes

References

External links 
 Official website
 Tobago House of Assembly

2020 in Trinidad and Tobago
Tobago